Garrha rubella is a moth in the family Oecophoridae. It was described by Turner in 1938. It is found in Australia, where it has been recorded from Tasmania.

References

Moths described in 1938
Garrha